Richard David Nerurkar MBE (born 6 January 1964) is a former track and field athlete from Great Britain, competing in the long-distance running events.

Personal life
Nerurkar was born in Wolverhampton, England, to an Indian father and English mother, he moved to Bradford, where he attended Bradford Grammar School. He has a brother and sister. 

He was a language teacher at Marlborough College between 1989 and 1991.

Career
Nerurkar won the English national cross-country championship three times and twice finished in the top 20 in the World Cross-Country Championships. On the track, he finished fifth in the 10,000 metres in the 1991 World Championships in Tokyo, and 17th in the 10,000m final of the 1992 Olympics. 

He holds the British record for 10 miles of 46:02, set in October 1993. That year he moved up in distance to the marathon.

He won his debut marathon in Hamburg in a time of 2:10:57 and went on to win his second marathon, the World Cup Marathon in San Sebastián, in October 1993. His other marathons included a fifth place in the 1996 Olympics and a personal best time of 2:08:36 in the 1997 London Marathon where he also finished in fifth place. His time was the third fastest of all time by a British athlete and is the fourth fastest as of 2016.

Post-retirement
Nerurkar is general manager of the Great Ethiopian Run event hosted yearly in Addis Ababa, an event he started in 2001 with Ethiopian long-distance runner Haile Gebrselassie. He is the author of the book Marathon Running: From Beginning to Elite. 

He was awarded the MBE in 2002.

He plays bass and sings backing vocals in an Isley brothers tribute band, with his fans referring to him as ‘Big Rich’.

Achievements

Personal bests

References

 British Olympic Committee
 Power of 10 profile
 Olympic record

1964 births
Living people
Sportspeople from Bradford
Sportspeople from Wolverhampton
English male marathon runners
Olympic athletes of Great Britain
Athletes (track and field) at the 1992 Summer Olympics
Athletes (track and field) at the 1996 Summer Olympics
World Athletics Championships athletes for Great Britain
People educated at Bradford Grammar School
English people of Indian descent
Members of the Order of the British Empire
Indian people of English descent